Mount Lopatin  is a mountain,  high, situated  east-southeast of Mount Riddolls in the Victory Mountains of Victoria Land, Antarctica. It was mapped by the United States Geological Survey from surveys and U.S. Navy air photos, 1960–64, and was named by the Advisory Committee on Antarctic Names for Boris Lopatin, a Soviet exchange scientist at McMurdo Station, 1968.

References

Mountains of Victoria Land
Borchgrevink Coast